Trinity Jo-Li Bliss (born May 11, 2009) is an American actress, singer and songwriter, most notable for her role as Tuktirey in James Cameron's Avatar franchise.

Career
In 2017, Bliss was cast as Tuktirey in James Cameron's Avatar sequels.

Since 2021, she has uploaded cover versions of songs and has sung some of her own. Her first studio album, Confessions of a Preteen, was released on January 20, 2023.

Filmography

Film

Television

Discography

References

American film actors
Living people
2009 births